In the mathematical theory of probability, Brownian meander  is a continuous non-homogeneous Markov process defined as follows:

Then the Brownian meander is defined by the following:

In words, let  be the last time before 1 that a standard Brownian motion visits . ( almost surely.) We snip off and discard the trajectory of Brownian motion before , and scale the remaining part so that it spans a time interval of length 1. The scaling factor for the spatial axis must be square root of the scaling factor for the time axis. The process resulting from this snip-and-scale procedure is a Brownian meander. As the name suggests, it is a piece of Brownian motion that spends all its time away from its starting point .

The transition density  of Brownian meander is described as follows:

 

we have

and

 

In particular,

 

References 

 
 

Wiener process
Markov processes